In Buddhism, a mental fetter, chain or bond  (Pāli: samyojana, Sanskrit: संयोजना, saṃyojana) shackles a sentient being to saṃsāra, the cycle of lives with dukkha.  By cutting through all fetters, one attains nibbāna (Pali; Skt.: निर्वाण, nirvāa).

Fetter of suffering 

Throughout the Pali canon, the word "fetter" is used to describe an intrapsychic phenomenon that ties one to suffering For instance, in the Khuddaka Nikaya's Itivuttaka 1.15, the Buddha states:

"Monks, I don't envision even one other fetter — fettered by which beings conjoined go wandering & transmigrating on for a long, long time — like the fetter of craving. Fettered with the fetter of craving, beings conjoined go wandering & transmigrating on for a long, long time."

Elsewhere, the suffering caused by a fetter is implied as in this more technical discourse from SN 35.232, where Ven. Sariputta converses with Ven. Kotthita:

Ven. Kotthita: "How is it, friend Sariputta, is ... the ear the fetter of sounds or are sounds the fetter of the ear?..."

Ven. Sariputta: "Friend Kotthita, the ... ear is not the fetter of sounds nor are sounds the fetter of the ear, but rather the desire and lust that arise there in dependence on both: that is the fetter there...."

Lists of fetters

The fetters are enumerated in different ways in the Pali canon's Sutta Pitaka and Abhidhamma Pitaka.

Sutta Pitaka's list of ten fetters

The Pali canon's Sutta Pitaka identifies ten "fetters of becoming":
belief in a self 
doubt or uncertainty, especially about the Buddha's awakeness and nine supermundane consciousnesses (vicikicchā)
attachment to rites and rituals (sīlabbata-parāmāsa)
sensual desire (kāmacchando)
ill will (vyāpādo or byāpādo)
lust for material existence, lust for material rebirth (rūparāgo)
lust for immaterial existence, lust for rebirth in a formless realm (arūparāgo)
conceit (māna)
restlessness (uddhacca)
ignorance (avijjā)

As indicated in the adjacent table, throughout the Sutta Pitaka, the first five fetters are referred to as "lower fetters" (orambhāgiyāni saṃyojanāni) and are eradicated upon becoming a non-returner; and, the last five fetters are referred to as "higher fetters" (uddhambhāgiyāni saṃyojanāni), eradicated by an arahant.

Three fetters

Both the Sagīti Sutta (DN 33) and the Dhammasai (Dhs. 1002-1006) refer to the "three fetters" as the first three in the aforementioned Sutta Pitaka list of ten:
belief in a self
doubt (vicikicchā)
attachment to rites and rituals (sīlabbata-parāmāsa)
According to the Canon, these three fetters are eradicated by stream-enterers and once-returners.

Abhidhamma Pitaka's list of ten fetters
The Abhidhamma Pitaka's Dhamma Sangani (Dhs. 1113-34) provides an alternate list of ten fetters, also found in the Khuddaka Nikaya's Culla Niddesa (Nd2 656, 1463) and in post-canonical commentaries.  This enumeration is: 
 sensual lust (Pali: kāma-rāga)
 anger
 conceit (māna)
 views
 doubt (vicikicchā)
 attachment to rites and rituals (sīlabbata-parāmāsa)
 lust for existence (bhava-rāga)
 jealousy (issā)
 greed (macchariya)
 ignorance (avijjā).
The commentary mentions that views, doubt, attachment to rites and rituals, jealousy and greed are thrown off at the first stage of Awakening (sotāpatti); gross sensual lust and anger by the second stage (sakadāgāmitā) and even subtle forms of the same by the third stage (anāgāmitā); and conceit, lust for existence and ignorance by the fourth and final stage (arahatta).

Fetters related to householder affairs

Uniquely, the Sutta Pitaka's  "Householder Potaliya" Sutta (MN 54), identifies eight fetters (including three of the Five Precepts) whose abandonment "lead[s] to the cutting off of affairs" (vohāra-samucchedāya saṃvattanti): 
 destroying life
 stealing
 false speech (musāvādo)
 slandering (pisunā)
 coveting and greed (giddhilobho)
 aversion (nindāroso)
 anger and malice (kodhūpāyāso) 
 conceit (atimāno)

For English translations, see

Individual fetters
The following fetters are the first three mentioned in the Sutta Pitaka's list of ten fetters, as well as the Sagīti Sutta and Abhidhamma Pitaka's list of "three fetters" (DN 33, Dhs. 1002 ff.).  As indicated below, eradication of these three fetters is a canonical indicator of one's being irreversibly established on the path to Enlightenment.

Identity view (sakkāya-dihi) 

Etymologically, kāya means "body," sakkāya means "existing body," and  means "view" (here implying a wrong view, as exemplified by the views in the table below).

In general, "belief in an individual self" or, more simply, "self view" refers to a "belief that in one or other of the khandhas there is a permanent entity, an attā."

Similarly, in MN 2, the Sabbasava Sutta, the Buddha describes "a fetter of views" in the following manner:

"This is how [a person of wrong view] attends inappropriately: 'Was I in the past? ... Shall I be in the future? ... Am I? Am I not? What am I? ...'

"As one attends inappropriately in this way, one of six kinds of view arises: ... 
'I have a self...'  
'I have no self...' 
'It is precisely by means of self that I perceive self...'
'It is precisely by means of self that I perceive not-self...'
'It is precisely by means of not-self that I perceive self...' 
'This very self of mine ... is the self of mine that is constant...'
"This is called a thicket of views, a wilderness of views, a contortion of views, a writhing of views, a fetter of views. Bound by a fetter of views, the uninstructed ... is not freed, I tell you, from suffering & stress."

Doubt (vicikicchā) 

In general, "doubt" (vicikicchā) refers to doubt about the Buddha's teachings, the Dhamma. (Alternate contemporaneous teachings are represented in the adjacent table.)

More specifically, in SN 22.84, the Tissa Sutta, the Buddha explicitly cautions against uncertainty regarding the Noble Eightfold Path, which is described as the right path to Nibbana, leading one past ignorance, sensual desire, anger and despair.

Attachment to rites and rituals (sīlabbata-parāmāso) 

Śīla refers to "moral conduct", vata (or bata) to "religious duty, observance, rite, practice, custom," and parāmāsa to "being attached to" or "a contagion" and has the connotation of "mishandling" the Dhamma. Altogether, sīlabbata-parāmāso has been translated as "the contagion of mere rule and ritual, the infatuation of good works, the delusion that they suffice" or, more simply, "fall[ing] back on attachment to precepts and rules."

While the fetter of doubt can be seen as pertaining to the teachings of competing samana during the times of the Buddha, this fetter regarding rites and rituals likely refers to some practices of contemporary brahmanic authorities.

Cutting through the fetters 

In MN 64, the "Greater Discourse to Mālunkyāputta," the Buddha states that the path to abandoning the five lower fetters (that is, the first five of the aforementioned "ten fetters") is through using jhana attainment and vipassana insights in tandem.  In SN 35.54, "Abandoning the Fetters," the Buddha states that one abandons the fetters "when one knows and sees ... as impermanent" (Pali: anicca) the twelve sense bases (āyatana), the associated six sense-consciousness, and the resultant contact (phassa) and sensations (vedanā). Similarly, in SN 35.55, "Uprooting the Fetters," the Buddha states that one uproots the fetters "when one knows and sees ... as nonself" (anatta) the sense bases, sense consciousness, contact and sensations.

The Pali canon traditionally describes cutting through the fetters in four stages:
one cuts the first three fetters to be a "stream enterer" (sotapanna);
one cuts the first three fetters and significantly weakens the next two fetters to be a "once returner" (sakadagami);
one cuts the first five fetters (orambhāgiyāni samyojanāni) to be a "non-returner" (anagami);
one cuts all ten fetters to be an arahant.

Relationship to other core concepts

Similar Buddhist concepts found throughout the Pali Canon include the five hindrances (nīvaraāni) and the ten defilements (kilesā). Comparatively speaking, in the Theravada tradition, fetters span multiple lifetimes and are difficult to remove, while hindrances are transitory obstacles.  Defilements encompass all mental defilements including both fetters and hindrances.

See also
Anatta, regarding the first fetter
Four stages of enlightenment, regarding cutting the fetters
Five hindrances, also involving the fourth (kamacchanda), fifth (vyapada), ninth (uddhacca) and second (vicikiccha) fetters
Upadana (Clinging), where the traditional four types of clinging are clinging to sense-pleasure (kamupadana), wrong views (ditthupadana), rites and rituals (silabbatupadana) and self-doctrine (attavadupadana)

Notes

References

Bibliography
Bodhi, Bhikkhu (2000). The Connected Discourses of the Buddha: A Translation of the Samyutta Nikaya. Somerville, MA: Wisdom Publications. .
Bodhi, Bhikkhu (18 Jan 2005). MN 10: Satipatthana Sutta (continued) [Ninth dharma talk on the Satipatthana Sutta (MP3 audio file)]. Available on-line at http://www.bodhimonastery.net/MP3/M0060_MN-010.mp3.
Gethin, Rupert (1998). The Foundations of Buddhism. Oxford: Oxford University Press. .
Gunaratana, Henepola (2003). Satipatthana Sutta [Dharma talks (MP3 on CD)]. High View, WV: Bhavana Society. Orderable on-line at https://web.archive.org/web/20070205193623/http://www.bhavanasociety.org/resource/satipatthana_sutta_cd/.
Harvey, Peter (1990/2007). An introduction to Buddhism: Teachings, history and practices.  Cambridge: Cambridge University Press. .
, Bhikkhu & Bhikkhu Bodhi (2001). The Middle Length Discourse of the Buddha: A Translation of the Majjhima Nikāya. Somerville, MA: Wisdom Publications. .
 Nyanaponika Thera (trans.) (1974). Alagaddupama Sutta: The Snake Simile (MN 22). Kandy: Buddhist Publication Society.  Retrieved 15 Aug. 2010 from "Access to Insight" (2006) at http://www.accesstoinsight.org/tipitaka/mn/mn.022.nypo.html .
 Rhys Davids, C.A.F. ([1900], 2003). Buddhist Manual of Psychological Ethics, of the Fourth Century B.C., Being a Translation, now made for the First Time, from the Original Pāli, of the First Book of the Abhidhamma-Piṭaka, entitled Dhamma-Sangaṇi (Compendium of States or Phenomena). Kessinger Publishing. .
Rhys Davids, T.W. & William Stede (eds.) (1921-5). The Pali Text Society’s Pali–English dictionary. Chipstead: Pali Text Society.  A general on-line search engine for the PED is available at http://dsal.uchicago.edu/dictionaries/pali/.
Soma Thera (1998) (6th rev. ed.). The Way of Mindfulness: The Satipatthana Sutta and Its Commentary. Available on-line at http://www.accesstoinsight.org/lib/authors/soma/wayof.html.
Sri Lanka Buddha Jayanti Tipitaka Series [SLTP] (undated).  [in Pali] (MN 54).  Available on-line at http://www.metta.lk/tipitaka/2Sutta-Pitaka/2Majjhima-Nikaya/Majjhima2/054-potaliya-p.html.
Thanissaro Bhikkhu (trans.) (1997a). Sabbasava Sutta: All the Fermentations (MN 2). Available on-line at http://www.accesstoinsight.org/tipitaka/mn/mn.002.than.html.
Thanissaro Bhikkhu (trans.) (1997). Samaññaphala Sutta: The Fruits of the Contemplative Life (DN 2). Available on-line at http://www.accesstoinsight.org/tipitaka/dn/dn.02.0.than.html.
Thanissaro, Bhikkhu (trans.) (1997b). Sona Sutta: About Sona (AN 6.55). Available on-line at http://www.accesstoinsight.org/tipitaka/an/an06/an06.055.than.html.
Thanissaro Bhikkhu (trans.) (2000). Sanyojana Sutta: Fetters (AN 10.13).  http://www.accesstoinsight.org/tipitaka/an/an10/an10.013.than.html.
Thanissaro Bhikkhu (trans.) (2001). The Group of Ones § 15 (Iti. 1.15).  Available on-line at http://www.accesstoinsight.org/tipitaka/kn/iti/iti.1.001-027.than.html#iti-015.
Thanissaro Bhikkhu (trans.) (2005). Tissa Sutta: Tissa (SN 22.84). Available on-line at http://www.accesstoinsight.org/tipitaka/sn/sn22/sn22.084.than.html.
Upalavanna, Sister (trans.) (undated). To The Householder Potaliya (MN 54).  Available on-line at https://web.archive.org/web/20101102225156/http://metta.lk/tipitaka/2Sutta-Pitaka/2Majjhima-Nikaya/Majjhima2/054-potaliya-e1.html.
Walshe, Maurice O'Connell (trans.) (1995). The Long Discourses of the Buddha: A Translation of the Dīgha Nikāya. Somerville: Wisdom Publications. .

External links
 The Fetters of 'I', 'Mine', 'Myself'

Buddhist philosophical concepts